The Plaza Universidad railway station is part of the Guadalajara light rail system in the Mexican state of Jalisco. The station is a transfer station that connects Lines 2 and 3 through Guadalajara Centro railway station.

Railway stations in Guadalajara
Guadalajara light rail system Line 2 stations
Railway stations located underground in Mexico
Railway stations opened in 1994